The Times Regal Tower is a 29-story,  skyscraper office building completed in 1999 in Zuoying District, Kaohsiung, Taiwan.

Incidents
On May 24th 2006, the girlfriend of a man surnamed Huang, who had been with him for two years, proposed to break up. Huang went to the building where his girlfriend lived in an attempt to recover the relationship, but was rejected. At 9 pm, Huang, who was mentally unstable, ascended to the top floor of the Times Regal Tower on Zhengxin Road, Zuoying District, Kaohsiung City, and leapt down. After receiving reports from witnesses, the fire department dispatched three teams of ladder trucks to the scene for rescue. The police tried in vain to dissuade Huang from committing suicide. Fortunately, Huang survived after he hit the roof of a car in the parking lot first before hitting the ground.

See also 
 List of tallest buildings in Taiwan
 List of tallest buildings in Kaohsiung

References

1999 establishments in Taiwan
Skyscraper office buildings in Kaohsiung
Office buildings completed in 1999